A gamemaster is a person who acts as an organizer for a multiplayer role-playing game.

Gamemaster or Game Master may also refer to:
Action Gamemaster, handheld multi-cartridge and CD-ROM clone console formerly in production by Active Enterprises, best known for Action 52
Action Gamemaster, character from The Cheetahmen
Gamemaster (board game series), board war game
Game Masters (exhibition),  exhibition at ACMI
Captain N: The Game Master, joint-venture between American-Canadian animated television series
Game Master (console), handheld game console
Konami Game Master, a game enhancer for the MSX home computer designed for Konami titles.
Game Master Network, a YouTube detective series and franchise

See also
Gamesmaster (disambiguation)